Metacordyceps is a genus of fungi in the family Clavicipitaceae.  The anamorphs of Metacordyceps appear to include Metarhizium species. 

Metacordyceps species attack insects in the orders Coleoptera and Lepidoptera, hosts that are common throughout all Cordyceps-like fungi.

Species
M. chlamydosporia
M. dhauladharensis
M. liangshanensis
M. taii

References

External links

Sordariomycetes genera
Clavicipitaceae